Tests for Real Men is a 1998 Russian drama film directed by Andrey Razenkov.

Plot 
The film takes place in one major city of Russia. The plot focuses on mother Anna and her daughter Elvira. In the past, Anna's husband could not protect her from hooligans and now she wants a real man next to her daughter. Therefore, the daughter's friend Alex passes various tests with getting into extreme situations...

Cast 
 Elvira Bolgova
 Aleksey Serebryakov	
 Anna Kamenkova
 Nikolay Eryomenko	
 Vitaly Solomin
 Igor Vetrov		
 Nikita Vysotskiy
 Zoya Zelinskaya

References

External links 
 

1998 films
1990s Russian-language films
Russian drama films
1998 drama films